Cleansing station may refer to:

 Baths and wash houses in Britain
 Chōzuya, a Shinto water ablution pavilion for a ceremonial purification rite known as temizu

See also
 Cleaning station, a location where aquatic life such as fish congregate to be cleaned